Charles Bernardini  is an American attorney and politician who served in local office in Chicago. He was an alderman of Chicago's 43rd Ward from 1993 to 1999.

Early life and career
He graduated from Streator Township High School. He then earned a bachelor of arts from University of Illinois Urbana-Champaign and a juris doctor from University of Illinois College of Law. He served as an aide to Speaker W. Robert Blair during the 77th Illinois General Assembly. An attorney, he served as a legal staffer for American Hospital Supply Corp, a special prosecutor for voter fraud, as counsel for Allstate Insurance Company, and as a professor at Loyola University Chicago's campus in Rome.

Political career
He served as the statewide chairman of IVI-IPO from 1978 to 1979 during which time he campaigned against the Cutback Amendment. In 1986, as an independent Democrat supproted by Harold Washington, Bernardini was elected to the Cook County Board of Commissioners as one of ten at-large members from Chicago. He resigned from the County Board in January 1992 to take a position as the head of the American Chamber of Commerce in Italy. The other nine Chicago commissioners appointed John P. Daley to the vacancy.

In November 1993, Richard M. Daley appointed Bernardini to succeed Edwin Eisendrath as Alderman from Chicago's 43rd ward.He retired rather than run for reelection in 1999. He was succeeded by Vi Daley.

References

Living people
Chicago City Council members
Members of the Cook County Board of Commissioners
Year of birth missing (living people)